The Malawi University of Science and Technology (MUST) is a public university in Thyolo in South Malawi. It was established on 17 December 2012. MUST opened doors in March 2014, the first undergraduate programmes were:
1. Metallurgy and Materials Engineering
2. Chemical Engineering
3. Biomedical Engineering

Undergraduate programmes
 Bachelor of Engineering (Hons) in Biomedical Engineering
 Bachelor of Engineering (Hons) in Chemical Engineering
 Bachelor of Engineering (Hons) in Metallurgy and Materials Engineering 
 Bachelor of Science in Earth Science (Geology)
 Bachelor of Science in Meteorology and Climate Science
 Bachelor of Science Geo-Information and Earth observation Science
 Bachelor of Science Disaster Risk Management
 Bachelor of Science in Business Information Technology
 Bachelor of Science in Medical Microbiology
 Bachelor of Science in Computer Systems and Security
 Bachelor of Science in Sustainable Energy Systems 
 Bachelor of Science in Water Quality and Management
 Bachelor of Science in Sport Science
 Bachelor of Arts in Indigenous Knowledge Systems and Practices
 Bachelor of Arts in African Musicology

Postgraduate programmes
 Master of Science in Innovation
 Master of Science in Entrepreneurship

Some researchers from the University

Mixon Faluweki 
Mixon is a lecturer in Physics. He invented the Padoko charger that was critical in assisting people to be able to charge their gadgets just from peddling a bicycle.

Gama Bandawe 
Lecturer and expert in medical virology. He has published extensively on HIV/AIDS with clinical perspectives. Gama has championed collaborations between the University and the seeding labs program which has/is benefited/benefiting the university at large.

Andrew Mtewa 
Lecturer in Chemistry and PhD fellow in drug development with a translational research approach focusing on drugs from hit sources to the clinic. He has authored books, book chapters and journal articles.

Prof. Wilson Mandala 
He is the Executive Dean of the Academy of Medical Sciences and Professor of Immunology. has successfully supervised at least five PhD and three MSc fellows. In terms of management, Professor Mandala has served as Director of the Research Support Centre at College of Medicine for two years and also served as Associate Director of the MLW. He also served as the Grant Director of Wellcome Trust funded SACORE and has served as the Malawian Board member on CARTA Board

Dumisani Namakhwa 
He is a Biomedical Engineering student at the Malawi University of Science and Technology (2016 - 2021)   has won numerous awards: National Bank of Malawi excellency Award; Finalist in 2021 Envision the Future Dell Technologies Graduation Project Competition (pending); Finalist of the 2020 Africa Biomedical Engineering Consortium Design competition. (January 2021) ; Awarded Higher Education Partnership in Sub-Saharan African (HEP SSA of the Royal Academy of Engineering) innovation award by Lilongwe University of Agriculture and Natural resources (August 2020). He also published article(s) in international journal(s).

References

External links

Malawi University of Science and Technology (MUST) pleads for engineering workshops
 Home
 Malawi University of Science in cassava wastes processing | Malawi Nyasa Times – Malawi breaking news in Malawi
 Must hands over ethanol stoves to farmers – The Nation Online
 Campaign for Female Education in visit to Malawi Science University | Malawi Nyasa Times – Malawi breaking news in Malawi
 Low female students intake at Malawi University of Science and Technology: ‘We don’t want to become boys only university’ | Malawi Nyasa Times – Malawi breaking news in Malawi
 Malawi University of Science and Technology should be responsive to country’s needs -Minister | Malawi Nyasa Times – Malawi breaking news in Malawi
 Airtel discusses innovations with Malawi University of Science and Technology students | Malawi Nyasa Times – Malawi breaking news in Malawi
 K239m laboratories inaugurated at Malawi University of Science and Technology | Malawi Nyasa Times – Malawi breaking news in Malawi

Universities in Malawi
Scientific organisations based in Malawi
2012 establishments in Malawi
Educational institutions established in 2012